Manuel Baldemor  is a Filipino painter, sculptor, printmaker, writer and book illustrator. He was born on March 26, 1947 in Paete, Laguna, Philippines.

He is best known for his paintings on various media that depict scenes in simplified geometric forms with a folk art character. Most of his subjects in art are his hometown, its people, their everyday activities, and their celebrations.

His works are known not only in the Philippines but also in other countries. He is an artist-in-residence in Chile, Estonia, France, Israel, Japan, Singapore, Switzerland and Portugal. His works is known internationally because UNICEF is reproducing his works as greeting cards that are distributed worldwide.

Early career and education 

Manuel Baldemor studied in the University of Santo Tomas College of Fine Arts and Design. He worked for Mabini Artist to support his financial needs as a student. He did academic plates for his classmates.

In his senior year, he worked as a layout artist an editorial cartoonist for the Philippine Graphic. This started his career in publication.

Career 

His career started as a painter when he depicted the beauty of his hometown Paete, Laguna through pen-and ink. His mural work "Paete I" won the grand prize  on Art Association of the Philippines Art Competition and Exhibition in 1972. The next year, his mural work "Paete II" won the same prize. His consecutive wins make way for him to become a representative of the Philippines for XIV International Art Exhibition in Paris in 1973. The art critic, Leonides Benesa, hails him as "The Folk Artist".

In the 1970s he developed his own brand of art that had fused his rural memories. He had several works that depicted the Philippines ideal through the use of Folk Modernist treatment.  His first exhibit "The Graphic of Manuel D. Baldemor" at the Hidalgo Gallery in 1972 marked the debut of his career.

He won his third gold prize for the annual Art Association of the Philippines competition for his fine prints in the year 1983. He experimented and tries other media such as, watercolour, acrylic, tempera, oil in canvas, woodcut, ceramics, glass, grass paper and fine prints.

Rosalinda Orosa, an art connoisseur and columnist, called him "The Chronicle of the Motherland" for depicting the beauty of all the places of the Philippines.  In 1992, the Cultural Center of the Philippines awarded him as one of the Thirteen Artist Awardees as recognition for his contributions to the country.

He garnered travel grants as artist –in-residence in France, England, Switzerland, Russia, Spain and Portugal in Europe; United States, Mexico and Chile in the Americas; Iran, Israel, Egypt, South Korea, India, Malaysia and China in Asia. Each country that he visits became his topic and subject for his art. He became known as International Artist and also the Most Travelled Artist for travelling for more than 50 countries.

In 1995, he celebrated his 25th Anniversary as an artist by exhibiting 2 reminiscing artworks at the Artists’ Corner in SM Megamall: "Sining Bayan" for being a Filipino Painter and "The Global Village" for being a painter of the world with the ambassadors of the countries where in he is an artist-in-residence as the honorable guests.  In 1998, President Fidel V. Ramos became his honorable guest for the inauguration of his mural "Pasasalamat" that is shown in the hall of United Nations Center in Vienna, Austria.

He is also known as a sculptor. He won his fourth gold prize for sculptor for the Annual Art Association of the Philippines Competition sculpture category in the year 1982. His winning piece was "Tribute to the Filipino Farmer" that was shown the in City Gallery at Luneta in 1980, as his tribute to his father, Perfecto S. Baldemor. In 1999, he became the representative of the country for the 3rd Inami International Wooden Sculpture Camp in Toyama Prefecture in Japan. In the span of his camping, he created the sculpture "Pamilyang Pilipino" with 1m wide and 4m high.

On October 1–14, 1999, he exhibited his 100th show entitled "A Distinctive Milestone" as a painter and sculptor at the Artists’ Corner in SM Megamall. At that time, he was the only artist to exhibit his works a hundred times.

He is also a writer; he is part of the Writers’ Guild of the Philippines. His poems and essays are featured in leading newspapers and magazines in the country. He became a columnist for culture in two major newspaper companies. In his weekly column entitled "Folio" of Manuel D. Baldemor in Sunday times of the Manila Times newspaper in 1992 to 1994. He continued his weekly column in the "Art and Culture Section" of "The Philippines Star" from 1997 to 1999.

He showed his skills as a graphic designer by making the souvenir program of XI World Congress of Cardiology in 1991, XXII International Conference on Internal Medicine in 1994, and other commemorative books about the history and cultivation of the Philippines.

In 1980, he is awarded "Gawad Sikap" for Visual Arts for the 400th anniversary of his hometown. Paetenians International Northeast Chapter acknowledged him as the "Paetenian of the Year"  in 1985 and one of the "Ten Outstanding Living Paetenians"in 2000.  He is also awarded as one of the "Natatanging Buhay na Anak ng Bayan" in the Celebration of Balik-Paete 2004.

He sometime leads the patronage and affirmation of Paete like his shows "Salubong" in Nayong Pilipino in 1978, "The Masters of Paete Exhibit" at the City Gallery, Luneta in 1980, grand exhibition of "The Paete Phenomenon" at the Cultural Center of the Philippines,  the tape-recording of the two historical concert of Band 69 – "Konsyerto ng Pamanang Himig" and "Konsyerto ng Sentenaryo ng Banda " – at the UP Abelardo Hall in 1997, the "Konsyerto ng Sentenaryo ng Kalayaan ng Bansa" inside the hundred-year Church of Paete, Laguna.

His works have been chosen and reproduced by UNICEF as a design for their greeting cards for the past 30 years, that generated for at least P35 million sales for the company.

Awards

Solo exhibits

Group exhibits

Books and publications

Notable people

Angeline Baldemor

Angelito Baldemor

Angelo Baldemor

Antero Baldemor

Celoine Baldemor

Charming Baldemor

Felix "Kid" Baldemor

Fred Baldemor

Leandro Baldemor

Mailah Baldemor-Balde

Marvin Baldemor

Mike Baldemor

Nick C. Baldemor

Vince Baldemor

Walter Baldemor

Wilfredo Baldemor

Wilson Baldemor

Zoerya Emi Baldemor Abuel

Vicente Mannsala

References

Bibliography 
Casanova, A. (2005). Tatlong Haligi ng Sining. In Mga Natatanging Anak ng PAETE. UST Publishing House.

Filipino painters
1947 births
Living people
Artists from Laguna (province)
Filipino printmakers